The Quakers and Moravians Act 1833 (3 & 4 Will. IV c. 49.) was an Act of the Parliament of the United Kingdom. The Act allowed Quaker and Moravian MPs to substitute an affirmation for an oath on their entrance to the House of Commons.

Notes

United Kingdom Acts of Parliament 1833